Lyuboslovie ( meaning Philology in English) is the first Bulgarian literary magazine.

Released for the first time in 1842 from Konstantin Fotinov in Smyrna (İzmir). In 1842 Fotinov printed a test book with the title "Lyuboslovie or Periodical Magazine of Miscellaneous Conducts" in a small format in volume of 32 pages. It is known that Lyuboslovie was conceived and executed according to the model of the Greek magazine Repository for useful knowledge (Αποθήκη των ωφελίμων γνώσεων), published in Smyrna during the period from 1837 to 1844. The magazine was presented to the British Bible Society by Protestant missionaries who found it in Asia Minor (Anatolia). It ceased publication in 1846.

Reference

 Данова, Н. Константин Георгиев Фотинов в културното и идейно-политическото развитие на Балканите през XIX век. С., 1994

Bulgarian National Revival
Bulgarian literature
Bulgarian-language magazines
Defunct literary magazines published in Europe
Defunct magazines published in Turkey
Magazines established in 1842
Magazines disestablished in 1846
Literary magazines published in Turkey
İzmir